The 2022 mayoral election in Charlotte, North Carolina was held on July 26, 2022. This represents a delay from the original schedule of the election, which would ordinarily have taken place in November 2021. Delays in the United States Census prompted delays for cities in the state that elect city council members by district in odd-numbered years. Charlotte's City Council had the option of holding the mayoral election on schedule in 2021 but voted to hold all elections at the same time. 

Charlotte's partisan primaries were held on May 17, the same day as the North Carolina statewide primary.

The incumbent Mayor, Democrat Vi Lyles, was first elected in 2017 and re-elected in 2019. She sought re-election to a third term and easily defeated Republican Stephanie de Sarachaga-Bilbao.

Democratic primary

Candidates

Nominee
Vi Lyles, incumbent Mayor

Eliminated in primary 
Tigress Sydney Acute McDaniel
Tae McKenzie
Lucille Puckett

Primary results

Republican primary

Candidates

Nominee
Stephanie de Sarachaga-Bilbao

Eliminated in primary 
M. Moustafa

Primary results

General election

Results

References

2022
Charlotte
Charlotte